Nicole Cusack (born 1966) is a former Australian netball player.  After Marcia Ella, she became the second indigenous Australian to represent the Australian Diamonds in 1989. After her playing retirement, she became a leading netball coach.

Personal
Cusack was born in 1966 and grew up in the Liverpool district, Sydney.

Netball
Prior to taking up netball, Cusack competed at the Australian Age Group Swimming Championships in 1979 and 1980 competing in the 100m and 200m backstroke.  She also played basketball in Sydney for the Bankstown Bruins in 1987 and 1988.

Playing in the Randwick Netball Association competition, Cusack was selected in the NSW 17/U team in 1982. In 1983, she was selected as goal attack for the New South Wales team at the U19 Australian Netball Championships. She held an Australian Institute of Sport (AIS) netball scholarship in 1984 and 1985. Whilst at the AIS, she was selected for the Australian U21 team.

Cusack debuted for the Australian Diamonds against the Silver Ferns on 26 April 1989 in Auckland, New Zealand. She was a member of the Australian Diamonds that competed at the 1990 Commonwealth Games as a demonstration sport. Cusack played 52 times for the Australian Diamonds and won gold medals at the 1995 Netball World Championship and the 1998 Commonwealth Games. She played for Sydney Sandpipers (1997) and the Melbourne Kestrels (1998) in the Commonwealth Bank Trophy. She retired after the 1998 Commonwealth Games.

After retiring as a player, Cusack continued her involvement as a netball coach. Positions held include Assistant Coach NSW Swifts (2001), AIS Netball Scholarship Coach (2008-2009), Australian U21’s World Champion Assistant Coach (2010), Australian Diamonds specialists Coach (2008–12), Queensland Firebirds Specialist Coach (2010–14) and South Africa Proteas Assistant Coach (2015–19).

Recognition
New South Wales Hall of Champions
Netball New South Wales Hall of Fame (2007)
Aboriginal and Torres Strait Islander Sports Hall of Fame

References

Living people
1966 births
Australian netball players
Netball players from Sydney
Indigenous Australian netball players
Australia international netball players
Australian Institute of Sport netball players
1995 World Netball Championships players
Australian netball coaches
Australian Institute of Sport netball coaches
Sydney Sandpipers players
Melbourne Kestrels players
Commonwealth Bank Trophy players
Netball players at the 1998 Commonwealth Games
Commonwealth Games gold medallists for Australia
Commonwealth Games medallists in netball
Netball players at the 1989 World Games
Netball players at the 1993 World Games